The Jacksonville Landing (informally The Landing) was a festival marketplace in Downtown Jacksonville, Florida, at the intersection of Independent Drive and Laura Street, along the Jacksonville Riverwalk. It was built by the Rouse Company for $37.5 million, opened in 1987, and officially closed after the 4th of July festivities in 2019. Demolition began about October 8, 2019. The  center was comparable to New York City's South Street Seaport, Boston's Faneuil Hall, and Miami's Bayside Marketplace, all developed by Rouse.

History

The Jacksonville Landing was designed and built by the Rouse Company, which built similar structures in other cities. It opened its doors on June 25, 1987, hosting a week-long celebration featuring a drum-and-bugle corps, balloon release, community choirs, and national acts. The Rouse company partnered with City of Jacksonville, which gave $20 million to the construction of a festival marketplace to revitalize the city's core.

The first floor of the Landing featured tenants that were common to other shopping malls when it first opened, including Foot Locker, The Gap, and Victoria's Secret. 

The second floor of the main building was devoted to the Founders Food Hall, a food court, with 18 restaurants. The décor featured silhouettes of 17 persons instrumental in the settlement of North Florida. Outside seating included a view of the center courtyard fountain and stage and of the river. Foot traffic never reached projected numbers, and within four years a third of the food court tenants had closed. The west side of the food court became a video arcade, Ostrich Landing, which also later closed. Ever more food tenants closed; in 2019, the food court closed completely, after the shooting at the Landing, and the Landing blocked and disabled the escalators. 

The Landing's first bar was Fat Tuesdays, which sold frozen alcoholic beverages. The business attracted mostly young customers; the Landing management decided not to renew the 10-year lease, citing a desire for an "older crowd".

The Rouse Company announced in 2003 that it would sell the Jacksonville Landing to a local developer, Toney Sleiman, for $5.1 million. The Florida Times-Union reported that Sleiman, who bought the buildings but not the city-owned land, would not have to pay the $100,000 rent required by the City of Jacksonville for the land until the city provided the 800 parking spaces that it had promised the previous owners.

The 23-year obligation was finally resolved in 2010. The Jacksonville City Council passed a bill to give $3.5 million for Sleiman's purchase of a parking lot near the Landing. That money included a 20-year parking-validation program at a cost of $2.5 million to the city. Mayor John Peyton vetoed the bill, and the council voted unanimously to override the veto. 

In May 2018, the City of Jacksonville informed Jacksonville Landing Investments, LLC, a subsidiary of Sleiman Enterprises, that the Jacksonville Landing had defaulted on the lease by not curing a breach of contract within the 30 days of notification. The City of Jacksonville demanded immediate access and possession of the property.

A mass shooting occurred at the video-game tournament that was held on August 26, 2018, at the GLHF Game Bar; three persons, including the perpetrator, were killed, and others injured.

On February 20, 2019, the city of Jacksonville and Sleiman Enterprises reached an $18-million settlement to transfer ownership of Jacksonville Landing to the city. The agreement includes $1.5 million to buy out the remaining tenants' leases and $1.5 million to demolish the mall for redevelopment of the site.

On May 1, 2019, the city of Jacksonville sent letters to the remaining tenants of Jacksonville Landing, giving them 30 days to vacate the premises.

The City of Jacksonville bought out the three remaining tenants' leases, paying $303,333.31 for the Hooters lease, $550,000 for the Fion MacCools lease, and $450,000 for the BBVA lease. BBVA must not open after October 28, 2019. 

The city received demolition bids and has bids ranging from $978,200 to $2,776,000. Plant City–based D. H. Griffin bid $1.074 million to tear down the Landing; this was one of seven sealed bids received by the deadline, 2 p.m. on June 14, 2019. The Department of Public Works recommended this bid to the General Government Awards Committee, which approved it at its next meeting. D. H. Griffin was to start site work 10 calendar days after the city sent the contractor a written notice to begin.

The Landing wasn't officially fully closed until after July 4, because it was the primary viewing spot for the downtown Independence Day fireworks.

On August 5, 2019, it was reported that D. H. Griffin Wrecking Co. Inc, the company hired to demolish the Landing, would erect fences so that demolition work could begin.

In August 2019, Mayor Lenny Curry discussed a plan to build at the site housing, restaurants, and a museum, staying "I think that those are the options that are on the table.  What will happen is, as demolition happens, the Downtown Investment Authority will put out a request for proposal to the market to say, you know, to private investors, 'What would you like to do here? What can you do here?' My personal opinion is it should be a combination of some green space—not all, [for] we don't want just a park there—but a combination of some green space and then some sort of buildings that are iconic, that serve the public. It's an important piece of property. I also think should you be able to see the river from Laura Street. We don't want to block the view of that wonderful jewel." Some citizens believe that the mayor didn't include them in the decision to demolish or renovate the Landing.

Location and services 

The two-level glass-and-steel complex with the orange roof is located on the north bank of the St. Johns River. The  complex at one time featured 65 stores as well as dining, with full-service restaurants plus a food court, and entertainment. The Landing staged a variety of special events. There was weekly live music on the courtyard stage. Most events took place in the open brick courtyard in the center of the horseshoe shaped structure. Just before the Georgia-Florida football game in 2007, the Landing installed a 19 × 15-foot (5.8 × 4.6 m) JumboTron in the courtyard.

Patronage
The Jacksonville Landing (usually referred to as just the Landing by locals) had a local patronage base of over 65,000 downtown office workers and over 1,000,000 residents in the surrounding metropolitan area of North Florida. According to various Florida travel sources, it had been "an icon" for Jacksonville and "one of the most recognized attractions in Northeast Florida" since it opened in June, 1987. Downtown Improvement District (DID) for Jacksonville claims it was a popular tourist destination.

Events
The Landing hosted more than 300 events each year including Florida/Georgia Weekend Celebrations, the annual Christmas Tree Lighting, New Year’s Eve and Gator Bowl Celebrations, St. Patrick’s Day, the Jacksonville Jazz Festival and July 4th fireworks. 

Weekly events included year-round live entertainment in the center courtyard every Friday, Saturday and Sunday. The bands offered a variety of music including classic rock, oldies, contemporary, jazz, and top 40. The Landing also hosted national country concerts and classic rock concerts in the spring, summer and fall each year.  

In September, 2010, The Landing announced a partnership with Downtown Vision to host an every Friday Farmer's Market from 10am to 2pm.  The market was relocated from Hemming Plaza. Since relocating to The Landing the market averaged over 40 vendors each week.

The Landing also hosted events for the community, such as charity walks and runs and the Earth Day Ecology Fair.

Museum
The Landing allowed the Jacksonville Maritime Museum to use unoccupied retail space to display their collection of large-scale model ships for seven years, beginning in 1990. It was a positive for both parties; the museum increased their exposure with a free venue and the Landing filled an otherwise empty storefront and offered a free attraction to increase foot traffic. Jacksonville Maritime Museum Society President John Lockhart explained, "Every time they would get a new tenant, they would move us to another empty space." That situation occurred five times in seven years, but in mid-November, 1997, the museum was given seven days to vacate in preparation for a new tenant. "This time, they just ran out of empty space," commented Lockhart. Many exhibits were put into storage.

In October 2011, the museum was invited to return to the landing, and was given a large space to use. Their former home on the Southbank of the Riverwalk was demolished as part of a larger renovation that included Friendship Fountain.

Gallery

See also 
 Jacksonville Riverwalk

References 

Shopping malls established in 1987
Economy of Jacksonville, Florida
Tourist attractions in Jacksonville, Florida
Buildings and structures in Jacksonville, Florida
Redeveloped ports and waterfronts in the United States
Shopping malls in Florida
Downtown Jacksonville
Northbank, Jacksonville
Laura Street
1987 establishments in Florida
2019 disestablishments in Florida
Demolished buildings and structures in Florida
Buildings and structures demolished in 2019
Demolished shopping malls in the United States